Keady Michael Dwyer's Gaelic Football Club is a Gaelic Athletic Association club from Keady, County Armagh, Northern Ireland. It is affiliated to Armagh GAA and plays Gaelic football in the Armagh Intermediate Championship. A sister club, Keady Lámh Dhearg, established in 1949, now provides for hurling. The club's ground is Gerard McGleenan Park.

History
The club was one of the first in Armagh, founded in 1888, a year before the creation of the GAA's Armagh County Board.

Honours

Football
 Armagh Senior Football Championship (4)
 1938, 1953, 1956, 1984
 Armagh Intermediate Football Championship (2)
 1983, 1995
 Armagh Junior Football Championship (5)
 1925, 1927, 1933, 1976, 2014, 2018
 Armagh Minor Football Championship (2)
 1947 (Inaugural), 1957

Notable players

 

Seamus Mallon

 Joseph “Stciky” Mckee

Hurling
In the 1930s the Dwyers enjoyed a run of success in the county Hurling Championship.

Honours
Armagh Senior Hurling Championship (3)
1935, 1936, 1937

References

Gaelic games clubs in County Armagh
Gaelic football clubs in County Armagh